The Diocese of Minervino Murge was a Roman Catholic diocese in Italy, located in the Province of Barletta-Andria-Trani in the ecclesiastical province of Bari.

History
900: Established as Diocese of Minervino (Italiano) / Minerbium

1818.06.27: Suppressed (to Diocese of Andria)

1968: Restored as Titular Episcopal See of Minervino Murge

Ordinaries
Sante (1433–1434 Resigned)
...
Roberto de Noya (Noja), O.P. (1492–1497 Appointed, Bishop of Acerra)
Marino Falconi (1497–1525 Died)
Antonio Sassolino, O.F.M. Conv. (1525–1528 Died)
Bernardino Fumarelli (1528–1529 Appointed, Bishop of Alife)
Giovanni Francesco de Marellis (1529–1536 Died)
Donato Martuccio (Maricucci) (1536–1545 Appointed, Bishop of Lavello)
Gian Vincenzo Micheli (1545–1596 Died)
Lorenzo Monzonís Galatina, O.F.M. (1596–1605 Resigned)
Giacomo Antonio Caporali (1606–1616 Died)
Altobello Carissimi (1617–1632 Died)
Giovanni Michele Rossi, O.C.D. (1633–1633 Appointed, Bishop of Alife)
Gerolamo Maria Zambeccari, O.P. (1633–1635 Resigned)
Antonio Maria Pranzoni (Franzoni) (1635–1663 Died)
Francesco Maria Vignola (1663–1700 Died)
Marcantonio Chenevix (1702–1718 Died)
Nicola Pignatelli (1719–1734 Died)
Fabio Troyli (1734–1751 Appointed, Bishop of Catanzaro)
Stefano Gennaro Spani (1751–1776 Died)
Pietro Silvio di Gennaro (1776–1779 Appointed, Bishop of Venosa)
Pietro Mancini (1792–1808 Died)

See also
Catholic Church in Italy

References

Former Roman Catholic dioceses in Italy
Roman Catholic dioceses in Apulia